The 2022–23 Oregon Ducks women's basketball team represented the University of Oregon during the 2022–23 NCAA Division I women's basketball season. The Ducks are led by ninth-year head coach Kelly Graves, and they played their home games at Matthew Knight Arena as members of the Pac-12 Conference.

Previous season 

The Ducks finished the season at 20–12 and 11–6 in Pac-12 play to finish in a tie for second place. They received a bye in the Pac-12 Tournament and they defeated UCLA in the quarterfinals before losing to Utah in the semifinals. They received an at-large bid to the NCAA Women's Tournament where they were upset by Belmont in the first round.

Offseason

Departures
Due to COVID-19 disruptions throughout NCAA sports in 2020–21, the NCAA announced that the 2020–21 season would not count against the athletic eligibility of any individual involved in an NCAA winter sport, including women's basketball. This meant that all seniors in 2020–21 had the option to return for 2021–22.

Incoming transfers

Recruiting

Recruiting class of 2023

Roster

Schedule

|-
!colspan=9 style=| Exhibition

|-
!colspan=9 style=| Regular Season

|-
!colspan=9 style=|Pac-12 Women's Tournament

|-
!colspan=9 style=| WNIT

Source:

Rankings

*The preseason and week 1 polls were the same.^Coaches did not release a week 2 poll.

See also
 2022–23 Oregon Ducks men's basketball team

Notes

References

Oregon Ducks women's basketball seasons
Oregon
Oregon Ducks
Oregon Ducks
Oregon